The barred tiger salamander or western tiger salamander (Ambystoma mavortium) is a species of mole salamander that lives in lower western Canada, the western United States and northern Mexico.

Description

It has a broad head and a sturdy body. The color is variable across its range. The dorsal surface is grey, dark brown or black with bars and spots of muddy yellow giving it a tiger-like coloring. The ventral surface varies from light to dark. Larvae have alternating dark and light blotches on the centre of the dorsal surface and pale stripes running along the sides.

Behavior
Primarily nocturnal, barred tiger salamanders are opportunistic feeders, and will often eat anything they can catch, including various insects, slugs, and earthworms. They are primarily terrestrial as adults, but their juvenile, larval stage is entirely aquatic, having external gills. Breeding takes place during most months of the year. The eggs are laid in water and the developing larvae are exclusively aquatic.

Cannibalism
There are two main feeding morphologies for barred tiger salamanders, typical and cannibalistic. The cannibalistic form is characterized by large vomerine teeth, slim bodies and wider heads. The teeth give a better hold on prey, and the wider heads allow for eating larger organisms. In some areas, these include fathead minnows. Since the two species have similar diets, eating a competitor also reduces demand on their shared food.

Cannibalistic tiger salamanders tend to metamorphosize earlier than the typical ones. Most often, cannibals are found in drier areas and shallow, more competitive waters, making earlier metamorphosis advantageous.

Subspecies
The five recognized subspecies of Ambystoma mavortium are:

 Gray barred tiger salamander, A. m. diaboli )
 Barred tiger salamander, A. m. mavortium
 Blotched tiger salamander, A. m. melanostictum
 Arizona tiger salamander, A. m. nebulosum
 Sonoran tiger salamander, A. m. stebbinsi

Distribution and habitat
The barred tiger salamander lives in western Canada and the western half of the United States, but infrequently in California and Nevada. In Canada it is known from British Columbia, Alberta, Saskatchewan and Manitoba. Its range in the United States extends to the southernmost tip of Texas, but no further east than the Dakotas and Oklahoma. It has been introduced into southern Arizona because its larvae are used as fish bait.

It is a mainly terrestrial species, living in lowland deciduous forests, coniferous forests and woodlands. It also inhabits open fields, rough ground, upland meadows, grasslands, deserts, semideserts and streams.

Status
The Sonoran tiger salamander was classified as an endangered species in 1997, due to increased human activity causing degradation and fragmentation of its habitat. It is also threatened by various disease outbreaks triggered by species not native to Arizona. Some introduced animals, such as crayfish, prey on it.

In captivity
Tiger salamanders are frequently kept in captivity; they mostly hide and ambush their prey. It is illegal to sell adults in most parts of the United States. Their large size allows for ease of feeding, and their hardy nature makes them excellent captives. Their larval stage is often sold as fishing bait, marketed as "mud puppies" or "water dogs".

Symbol
The tiger salamander is the state amphibian of Kansas. The second grade class of 1993 of O‑K Elementary in Wichita, Kansas, petitioned the governor;  students Timothy Boyd and Kristofer Voorhees presented the initial idea for a state amphibian to their teacher. It is also the state amphibian of Colorado after being recognized by the Colorado legislature on March 16, 2012.

References

Unused sources

External links
 
 

Mole salamanders
Amphibians described in 1850
Amphibians of Canada
Amphibians of Mexico
Amphibians of the United States
Fauna of the Western United States
Symbols of Colorado
Symbols of Kansas
Taxa named by Spencer Fullerton Baird